The CaithnessMoray Link is a  HVDC submarine power cable beneath the Moray Firth in Scotland, linking Spittal in Caithness and Blackhillock in Moray. Constructed by Scottish & Southern Electricity Networks, it is capable of transmitting up to 1,200MW of power. It was officially completed in January 2019, under budget at a cost of £970million, and was reported as the largest single investment in the northern Scottish electricity network since the 1950s.

The link was constructed to improve the connectivity of the Scottish electricity transmission network, and allow increased flow of electricity from renewable energy sources in the north of Scotland, such as the Beatrice and Dorenell wind farms. It is the second HVDC link to be constructed within the National Grid (as opposed to as an interconnector), after the Western HVDC Link.

Construction
The route was originally intended to form part of the Shetland HVDC Connection, however the project was split into two parts, with the Caithness - Moray link to be constructed first at a projected cost of £1.2billion.

The project required the construction of two new HVDC converter stations, at Spittal and Blackhillock, with the construction contract for these awarded to ABB. After the addition of the converter station, Blackhillock Substation became the largest in the UK, at the size of 24 football pitches.

The wider project also involved the augmentation of other parts of the power transmission network in northern Scotland, with upgrades carried out on a total of eight substations and two overhead transmission lines.

References

Notes

External links

 

Electric power infrastructure in Scotland
Electrical interconnectors to and from Great Britain
HVDC transmission lines
Submarine power cables
Energy infrastructure completed in 2019
2019 establishments in Scotland